The Kingdom of Kaski  was a petty kingdom in the confederation of 24 states known as Chaubisi Rajya. Kaski was annexed to the Kingdom of Nepal during the Unification of Nepal.

References 

Chaubisi Rajya
Kaski
Kaski
History of Nepal
Kaski